Averill Hill was an Anglican priest in Ireland in the late 18th and early 19th centuries.

Hill was born in Dublin and educated at Trinity College, Dublin. He was  Archdeacon of Limerick from 1803 until his death in 1814. He is buried in St. Munchin's Churchyard.

References

Archdeacons of Limerick
Alumni of Trinity College Dublin
19th-century Irish Anglican priests
Church of Ireland priests
1814 deaths
Civil servants from Dublin (city)